Keurusselkä is a lake in Central Finland between the towns of Keuruu to the north and Mänttä to the south. Keurusselkä gained international publicity in 2004 when a pair of amateur geologists discovered an ancient impact crater on the western shore of the lake.

Environmental issues
In 1986, the Keurusselkä region was heavily contaminated (70 kBq/m2) by radioactive caesium, from the Chernobyl disaster fallout. In 2003, some fish near Mänttä still had caesium concentrations several times higher than in Olkiluoto and Loviisa, which host the nuclear plants of Finland. This is due to the difference between the uptake of caesium in fresh water and brackish or saline water. However, the concentration levels are so small that eating the fish is not considered a health risk.

Apart from radioactivity, the water quality is also weakened by humic substances and local sewage. Despite that, the water quality is generally good, and the central part of the lake is in almost pristine condition. The lake is considered good for fishing, and the pike (Esox lucius) and perch (Perca fluviatilis) populations are especially large.

Keurusselkä impact structure
Keurusselkä covers an ancient impact crater remnant, which was discovered in 2003 by amateur geologists. This would make Keurusselkä the largest impact structure in Finland surpassing the Lappajärvi crater.

Argon-argon dating of a pseudotachylitic breccia from the central uplift of the Keurusselkä impact structure yielded a late Mesoproterozoic age of 1.14-1.15 Ga (thousand million years) for the impact., which makes Keurusselkä one of the oldest impact structures known in Europe. The age of the local granite bedrock of the Central Finland Granite Complex is 1.88 Ga (Paleoproterozoic). Since the impact, 7–8 km of rock has eroded away, leaving no visible depressions (compare, in contrast, Iso-Naakkima, Lumparn).

Sparse gravity data shows a negative anomaly (an area of lower gravity) in the area of the impact structure. However, there are other negative gravity anomalies nearby which are not believed to be related to the impact event. In addition, there are less dense felsic rocks in the western shore of the lake, which can contribute to the gravity low. The anomaly will be mapped in a much greater detail to determine if it is related to the impact event.

Airborne magnetic data show a strikingly circular magnetic anomaly, but for a reason not yet known it is slightly east from the gravity low area as well as the region where the shatter cones are found. It is possible that the ring was created for example by a granitic intrusion instead of the impact event. No specific anomalies have been found from radiometric or electromagnetic data. Paleomagnetic data will be collected to define the age of the structure.

See also
Impact craters in Finland

References

External links

Impact craters of Finland
Kokemäenjoki basin
Magnetic anomalies
Proterozoic impact craters
Lakes of Keuruu
Impact crater lakes